Friesenheim is an Ortsgemeinde – a municipality belonging to a Verbandsgemeinde, a kind of collective municipality – in the Mainz-Bingen district in Rhineland-Palatinate, Germany.

Geography

Location
The municipality lies between Mainz and Worms and is an agriculturally oriented community. The winegrowing centre belongs to the Verbandsgemeinde Rhein-Selz, whose seat is in Oppenheim.

Neighbouring municipalities
These are Köngernheim, Undenheim and Weinolsheim.

History
In 803, Friesenheim had its first documentary mention in the Codex Fuldensis when the Frank Theotbald donated estates in Dubilesheim and Friesenheim to the Lorsch Abbey. Some researchers, though, link this entry in the Codex with Friesenheim in Alsace. The name's meaning is “Friso’s Home”. Based on the name German word Friesen (“Frisians”), the reasonable assumption is the community was founded by Frisians.

Politics

Municipal council
The council is made up of 13 council members, counting the part-time mayor, with seats apportioned thus:

(as at municipal election held on 13 June 2004)

Ortsbürgermeister 
The Ortsbürgermeister – mayor of the Ortsgemeinde – is Daniel Kölsch, elected in May 2019.

Coat of arms
The municipality's arms might be described thus: Gules a lion rampant argent armed sable and crowned Or, and a chief of the second.

References

External links

 Municipality’s official webpage 

Rhenish Hesse
Mainz-Bingen